Struga Poetry Evenings (SPE) (СВП;  tr. Struški večeri na poezijata, SVP) is an international poetry festival held annually in Struga, North Macedonia. During the several decades of its existence, the Festival has awarded its most prestigious award, the Golden Wreath, to some of the most notable international poets, including: Mahmoud Darwish, Sachchidananda Hirananda Vatsyayan Agyey, W. H. Auden, Joseph Brodsky, Allen Ginsberg, Bulat Okudzhava, Pablo Neruda, Eugenio Montale, Léopold Sédar Senghor, Artur Lundkvist, Hans Magnus Enzensberger, Nichita Stănescu,  Ted Hughes, Ko Un, Adunis, Makoto Ooka, Miroslav Krleža, Yehuda Amichai, Seamus Heaney, Tomas Gösta Tranströmer, Bei Dao, Amir Or and domestic authors such as Blaže Koneski and Mateja Matevski.

History

The festival began in 1961 in Struga, then People's Republic of Macedonia with Macedonian poets only, while in 1963 it expanded its list of participants with poets from all around the former Socialist Federal Republic of Yugoslavia. The Miladinov Brothers Award was established for the best poetry book published between two consecutive festivals. By 1966 the event turned into an international cultural festival. The Golden Wreath international award was established in the same year and its first recipient was Robert Rozhdestvensky. In 2003, in close cooperation with UNESCO, the Festival established another international award called The Bridges of Struga, for a best debut poetry book by a young author. During its long successful existence, the festival has hosted about 4,000 poets, translators, essayists and literary critics from about 95 countries of the world.

The festival has awarded some of the world's most eminent literary figures, including several Nobel Prize for Literature winners such as Joseph Brodsky, Eugenio Montale, Pablo Neruda and Seamus Heaney, the first African member of the French Academy Léopold Sédar Senghor who was also a President of Senegal, the official royal Poet Laureate Ted Hughes, W. H. Auden who is regarded by many as one of the greatest writers of the 20th century and many others.

A point of interest is that the festival often awarded foreign poets who were considered dissidents in their countries, including for example the Russian exiled poet Joseph Brodsky, the Chilean poet Pablo Neruda, the American beatnik Allen Ginsberg, the Soviet bard Bulat Okudzhava and many others.

In memory of the laureates, the Park of Poetry featuring memorial boards dedicated to each of them was established near the Struga Cultural Center.

Organization
The festival has offices in Struga and in Skopje (an office director, an executive and a technical secretary) and is organized by a Festival Board, which consists of knowledgeable professionals in the field of poetry (poets, literary critics, translators, and professors in comparative literature and culture).

Events
The festival consists of several events held at different locations:

 Opening ceremony on the plateau in front of the Cultural Centre in Struga including a traditional reading of Taga za Jug (Macedonian language: Т’га за југ, A Longing for The South), the famous nostalgic lyrical poem written by the Struga-born poet Konstantin Miladinov during his life in Imperial Russia. 
Meridijani (Меридијани, Meridians) a poetry reading by various international poets in the Cultural Centre following the opening ceremony.
Portret na Laureatot (Портрет на Лауреатот, Portrait of the Lauerate) an event devoted to the year's main award recipient traditionally held in the church of St. Sofia in the nearby city of Ohrid usually accompanied by classical music, opera or domestic or foreign ethnic music performance.
Noći bez interpukcija (Ноќи без интерпукција, Nights without Punctuation) multimedia artistic events featuring experimental forms of poetic presentations, which can also include other arts like music and video art.
 Daily poetry picnic at Sveti Naum springs near the Ohrid Lake including Ethnic Macedonian music and dances.
Mostovi (Мостови, Bridges) the closing ceremony held at the Bridge of Poetry on the river Drim in Struga including poetry readings and the awarding ceremony.  
 
Other events include workshops, round-table discussions on various social topics and their influence on poetry, etc.

Another event in the so-called Caravan of Poetry, which consists of poetry performances around the country. Usually, after the end of the Festival, the Festival also organizes poetry readings in the national capital, Skopje.

Awards
Zlaten Venec na Poezijata (Златен Венец на Поезијата, Golden Wreath of Poetry), the main international award given to a world-renowned living poet for life achievement in the field of poetry. The recipient's name is publicized usually several months in advance. 
Brakja Miladinovci (Браќа Миладиновци, Miladinov Brothers Award) for a best book published between two festivals.
The Bridges of Struga, for a best debuting author.
Iselenička gramota, for poets from the Macedonian diaspora.

Golden Wreath laureates

Bridges of Struga laureates

 2004 Angelo V. Suárez (Philippines)
 2005 Andrea Cote (Colombia)
 2006 Marianna Geide (Russia)
 2007 Manua Rime (Belgium)
 2008 Antonia Novakovic (Croatia)
 2009 Ousmane Sarrouss (Senegal)
 2010 Siim Kera (Estonia)
 2011 Hiroshi Taniuchi (Japan)
 2012 François-Xavier Maigre (France)
 2013 Nikolina Andova Shopova (North Macedonia)
 2014 Harry Man (United Kingdom)
 2015 Paula Bozalongo (Spain)
 2016 Runa Svetlikova (Belgium)
 2017 Goran Čolakhodžić (Croatia)
 2018 Pauli Tapio (Finland)
 2019 Monika Herceg (Croatia)
 2020 Martina Strakova (Slovenia)
 2021 Vladan Kreckovic (Serbia)
 2022 Gerardo Masuccio (Italy)

Publications
The Struga Poetry Evenings organization is also involved in book publishing.

Poetry anthologies

References

External links
 
 World poetry comes to Struga — Southeast European Times
 UNESCO DG, Irina Bokova celebrates the 50th anniversary of the Struga Poetry Evenings
 World Poetry Day — UNESCO official portal
 Celebration of World Poetry Day — UNESCO official portal
  Struga Poetry Evenings Festival — UNESCO official website
 Exploring Macedonia National Tourism Portal
 Macedonia: Decades-Old International Poetry Festival in Focus - Global Voices

 
Recurring events established in 1962
1962 establishments in Yugoslavia
Annual events in North Macedonia
Festivals in Yugoslavia